Robert Martin may refer to:

Politicians
 Robert N. Martin (1798–1870), American politician, U.S. Representative from Maryland
 Robert Martin (Oklahoma governor) (1833–1897), American politician, Governor of Oklahoma Territory, 1891–1892
 Robert Martin (New Jersey politician) (born 1947), New Jersey state senator
 Robert Martin (Canadian politician) (1858–?), pharmacist and political figure in Saskatchewan, Canada

Sports
 Robert Martin (bobsleigh) (1900–1942), American bobsledder
 Robert Martin (cricketer) (1918–1985), English cricketer

Others
 Robert Martin (singer) (born 1948), American singer, songwriter and musician
 Robert "Bob" Martin (1948–2020), American magazine editor and screenwriter
 Robert Martin (audio engineer) (1916–1992), American audio engineer
 Robert Martin, bass player with Curved Air
 Robert Martin (cinematographer) (1891–1980), American cinematographer
 Robert Martin (anti-war activist) (born 1949), Australian conscientious objector to the Vietnam War
 Robert Bernard Martin (1918–1999), American scholar of Victorian literature
 Robert Montgomery Martin (1801–1868), British author and civil servant
 Robert C. Martin, software professional and co-author of the Agile Manifesto
 Robert fitz Martin (died c. 1159), Norman knight and first Lord of Cemais, Wales
 Robert Hugh Martin (1896–1918), World War I heart patient pioneer 
 Robert S. Martin (born 1949), American librarian, director of the Institute of Museum and Library Services
 Stephen Donaldson (activist) (Robert Anthony Martin, Jr, 1946–1996), American LGBT and prison activist
 Robert Martin (aviator) (1919–2018), Tuskegee Airmen during WW2
 Robert Martin (disability rights activist) (born 1957), New Zealand activist for the rights of people with intellectual disability
 Robert D. Martin (born 1942), British-born biological anthropologist
 Rob Martin (bishop), bishop of Marsabit in the Anglican Church of Kenya

See also 
 Bob Martin (disambiguation)
 Bobby Martin (disambiguation)
 James Robert Martin Jr.